The Creswellian is a British Upper Palaeolithic culture named after the type site of Creswell Crags in Derbyshire by Dorothy Garrod in 1926. It is also known as the British Late Magdalenian. According to Andreas Maier: "In current research, the Creswellian and Hamburgian are considered to be independent but closely related entities which are rooted in the Magdalenian." The Creswellian is dated between 13,000 and 11,800 BP and was followed by the most recent ice age, the Younger Dryas, when Britain was at times unoccupied by humans.

History

The term Creswellian appeared for the first time in 1926 in Dorothy Garrod's The Upper Palaeolithic Age in Britain. This was the first academic publication by the woman who in 1939 became the first woman ever to be elected as a professor at Cambridge. It is also the first monograph about the Upper Paleolithic of Britain at the national level and it remained the only one on the subject for half a century. Garrod suggested that the British variant of the Magdalenian industry is different enough to create a specific name:

The definition of Creswellian was refined since then and now refers exclusively, in the British context, to the Late Magdalenian-style industry.

Description

Diagnostic tools used to identify the period include  trapezoidal backed blades called Cheddar points, variant forms known as Creswell points, and smaller bladelets. Other tool types include end scrapers made from long, straight blades. A special preparation technique was employed to remove blades from a core through striking in a single direction, leaving a distinct 'spur' on the platform. The tools were made using a soft hammerstone or an antler hammer.

Other finds include Baltic amber, mammoth ivory and animal teeth and bone. These were used to make harpoons, awls, beads and needles. Unusual bevelled ivory rods, known as sagaies have been found at Gough's Cave in Somerset and Kent's Cavern in Devon.

Twenty eight sites producing Cheddar points are known in England and Wales though none have so far been found in Scotland or Ireland, regions which it is thought were not colonised by humans until  later. Most sites are caves but there is increasing evidence for open air activity and that preferred sources of flint were exploited and that tools travelled distances of up to 100 miles from their sources. Some of the flint at Gough's Cave came from the Vale of Pewsey  in Wiltshire whilst non-local seashells and amber from the North Sea coast also indicate a highly mobile population. This matches evidence from the Magdelanian cultures elsewhere in Europe and may suggest that exchange of goods and the sending out of specialised expeditions seeking raw materials may have been practised. Analysis of debitage at occupation sites suggests that flint nodules were reduced in size at source and the lighter blades carried by Creswellian groups as 'toolkits' in order to reduce the weight carried.

Comparison of flint from Kent's Cavern and Creswell Crags has led some archaeologists to believe that they were made by the same group.

Food species eaten by Creswellian hunters focused on the wild horse (Equus ferus) or the red deer (Cervus elaphus), probably depending on the season, although the Arctic hare, reindeer, mammoth, Saiga antelope, wild cow, brown bear, lynx, Arctic fox and wolf were also exploited.

Highly fragmentary fossil bones were found in Gough's Cave at Cheddar. They had marks that suggested actions of skinning, dismembering, defleshing and marrow extraction. The excavations of 1986-1987 noted that human and animal remains were mixed, with no particular distribution or arrangement of the human bones. They also show the signs of the same treatments as the animal bones. These findings were interpreted in the sense of a nutritional cannibalism. However, slight differences from other sites in skull treatment leave open the possibility of elements of ritual cannibalism.

See also

Hamburg culture

References

Further reading
R. N. E. Barton, R. M. Jacobi, D. Stapert, & M. J. Street (2003)  The Late-glacial reoccupation of the British Isles and the Creswellian Journal of Quaternary Studies Volume 18, Issue 7 October 2003, Pp 631–643 
Lynden Cooper A Creswellian campsite, Newtown Linford  Leic.Arch. Sept 2002 11/10/02 7:55 AM Page 78 
Campbell, J.B. 1977 The Upper Palaeolithic of Britain: a study of man and nature during the Late Ice Age. Oxford: Clarendon press.
Garrod, D.A.E. 1926 The Upper Palaeolithic Age in Britain. Oxford: Clarendon Press.
Grant M & Harding P, Farndon Fields, Nottinghamshire: in situ multi-phased Late Upper Palaeolithic activity on the floodplain 
Jacobi, R.M. 1991 The Creswellian, Creswell and Cheddar. In: Barton, N., Roberts, A.J. and Roe, D.A. (eds) The Late Glacial in north-west Europe: human adaptation and environmental change at the end of the Pleistocene. London: Council for British Archaeology Research Report 77, 128-140.
Jenkinson R.D.S. and Gilbertson, D.D. 1984 In the Shadow of Extinction: A Quaternary Archaeology and Palaeoecology of the Lake, Fissures and Smaller Caves at Creswell Crags, S.S.S.I. Sheffield: University of Sheffield, Department of Prehistory and Archaeology.
Ward T & Saville A ‘‘Howburn Farm: excavating Scotland's first people. Current Archaeology, Issue 243, June 2010 pp18–23. 

Archaeological cultures in England
Magdalenian
Collections of Derby Museum and Art Gallery
Stone Age Britain
11th millennium BC